Progressive inflammatory neuropathy is a disease that was identified in a report, released on January 31, 2008, by the Centers for Disease Control and Prevention. The first known outbreak of this neuropathy occurred in southeastern Minnesota in the United States. The disease was reported among pig slaughterhouse workers who appeared at various care facilities in the area reporting similar neurological symptoms. The disease was later identified at pork processing plants in Indiana and Nebraska as well. The condition is characterized by acute paralysis, pain, fatigue, numbness, and weakness, especially in extremities.  It was initially believed that workers might have contracted the disease through inhaling aerosols from pig brains blown through a compressed-air hose and that this exposure to pig neural tissue induced an autoimmune response that might have produced their mysterious peripheral neuropathy. These suspicions were confirmed in reports and investigations conducted at the Mayo Clinic in Rochester, Minnesota.

Cause

An initial comprehensive study of 24 known cases was conducted by multiple doctors from various disciplines at the Mayo Clinic.  They identified the cause of this neurological disease to be occupational exposure to aerosolized pig neural tissue. Investigators from the Minnesota Department of Health simultaneously determined that the 70 ppsi pressure used to liquefy and extract the pig brains caused the aerosolization of the pig neural tissue, sending it into the air in a fine mist. The workers closest in proximity to the "head" table, the area in the plant where high pressured air was used to evacuate the brain tissue from the pig's skull, were the most likely to be affected. The aerosolized mist was inhaled and readily absorbed into the workers' mucus membranes. The pig neural tissue was recognized by their systems as foreign and an immune response was initiated. The pig antigen was found most prominently in the nerve roots of the spine which were also swollen. Researchers determined that the irritation was due to the voltage-gated potassium channels being blocked. They identified 125 1-α-dendrotoxin as the antagonist that binds to and blocks the channels, causing an intracellular build-up of potassium ions which causes inflammation and irritation, and consequently, hyper-excitability in the peripheral nervous system. It is this hyper-excitability that leads to the tingling, numbness, pain, and weakness.

Researchers from the Mayo Clinic developed a mouse model that received twice daily liquefied pig neural tissue intranasally to replicate the symptoms that the workers were experiencing. Physiological testing indicated signature antibodies in the mouse model at 100% in potassium channel antibodies and myelin basic antibodies, and 91% in calcium channel antibodies. This model allowed the researchers to decipher what was causing these neurological symptoms.  It was found that the potassium channels were being blocked so that inflammation was occurring at the nerve root and causing hyper-excitability down the peripheral nerves.

Diagnosis

Over 40 laboratory tests were initially conducted to rule out various pathogens and environmental toxins. These tests were used to try to identify potential viruses carried by humans, pigs, or both, including rotaviruses, adenoviruses, hepatitis A, and hepatitis E. They also tried to identify bacteria such as Salmonella and Escherichia coli, and parasites such as Giardia and Cryptosporidium that could be causing the symptoms.  All were ruled out.

Neurodegenerative diseases were considered specifically because of the similarity of symptoms and animal involvement thus included investigation of prion associated diseases such as bovine spongiform encephalopathy (BSE), chronic wasting disease (CWD), and variant Creutzfeldt–Jakob disease. These all have highly transmissible pathogenic agents that induce brain damage.  Since no pathogenic agent had been found, these diseases were ruled out as being related.

Next two very similar neuropathies were ruled out. Guillain–Barré syndrome induces an acute autoimmune response which affects the Schwann cells in the peripheral nervous system. Guillain–Barré syndrome is usually triggered by an infection that causes weakness and tingling that may lead to muscle loss. This condition may be life-threatening if muscle atrophy ascends to affect the pulmonary or cardiac systems. So far, no infectious agents have been found that relate to the current disease, progressive infammatory neuropathy. They looked at chronic inflammatory demyelinating polyneuropathy which is characterized by progressive weakness and sensory impairment in the arms and legs. Damage occurs to the myelin sheath in the peripheral nervous system. As doctors at the Mayo Clinic were beginning to note, the problem they were seeing in progressive inflammatory neuropathy was occurring in the spinal nerve roots.

Treatment

In October 2007 an astute medical interpreter noticed similar neurological symptoms being reported by Spanish-speaking patients seeking treatment from different physicians at the Austin Medical Center, in Austin, Minnesota. Not only did these patients share similar neurological symptoms, they also worked at the same pork processing plant. Dr. Daniel LaChance, a physician at both the Austin Medical Center and the Mayo Clinic in nearby Rochester, Minnesota, was notified.  He launched a request to area physicians to refer other patients with similar symptoms to him. The Minnesota Department of Health was notified and began an investigation into the "outbreak." They identified workers from two other pork processing plants in Indiana and Nebraska who also had parallel neurological complaints. Several agencies including the Occupational Safety and Health Administration and the Centers for Disease Control and Prevention were brought in to assist. Simultaneously investigations were conducted to rule out contagious disease, to locate the source or carrier, and to identify what exactly was causing these workers to develop these symptoms.

Removal from exposure was the first line of treatment.  Due to progressive sensory loss and weakness, immunotherapy was often required. These treatments included intravenous methylprednisolone, oral prednisone, azathioprine, and/or immunoglobulin. All 24 patients improved, including 7 who received no treatment and 17 who required immunotherapy.

Prognosis

It is expected that there will be no new cases of progressive inflammatory neuropathy since the process of aerosolizing the pig brains has been discontinued at all pork processing facilities.

See also

 Autoimmune disease
 Neuropathy
 Peripheral neuropathy
 Polyneuropathy

References

Autoimmune diseases
Neurological disorders